Necros Christos (Greek νεκρός Χριστός for 'Dead Christ') was a German death doom band from Berlin. The band was founded in 2001 and is under contract to Ván Records. The group has released three studio albums.

History
The band released three demo and two rehearsal recordings as well as several EPs and singles in the first years. Actually, the first demo Necromantic Doom should be the band's only release. In 2006, the band got signed by Sepulchral Voice Records, and a year later, the debut album Triune Impurity Rites was released.

Soon, the drummer Luciferus Christhammer left the band and was replaced by Raelin Iakhu. Over a period of four years, the musicians worked on their second album Doom of the Occult, which was released in the spring of 2011 and was well received by the press.

In 2018, the band published Domedon Doxomedon, the third studio album. It was announced by the band that the album is intended to be their final album. The album peaked at #90 in the German charts.

They announced in 2021 that they are splitting up. Mors Dalos Ra and drummer Iván Hernández would then shift their focus to their Death-thrash project Sijjin.

Style
The music of Necros Christos renounces high speeds, blast beats and demonstrations of the technical skills of the musicians, and instead focuses on "slow, simple, panzer-like heaviness in conjunction with sinister growls and a strange, indefinable occult quality". In the context of the metal subculture, singer and songwriter Mors Dalos Ra sees the band more in the tradition of bands like Black Sabbath and Mercyful Fate in their occult orientation than in the modern-sounding, blastbeat-heavy death metal bands. His musical inspiration, however, comes more from the Eastern folklore, especially Persia, India and the Arab countries. As a further important source he gives Italian and German Baroque music and old occult 1960s / 1970s rock like Coven or Salem Mass, as well as The Jimi Hendrix Experience.

Mors Dalos Ra also writes the lyrics for Necros Christos. While his occult interests and studies are primarily Kabbalah-related, most texts deal with inverted Old Testament stories, the Apocalypse in the Apocrypha, ancient middle Eastern cultures, the mysteries of death, necromancy, black masses and copulation, mixed with his own experiences. Mors Dalos Ra explains the name of the band as another name of the amorphous entity of extreme damnation and darkness, the black brother of Christ, who is already known by names such as Ishtar, Ahriman, Shaitan, Satan and Lucifer.

Discography

Demos
 2002: Necromantic Doom
 2003: Black Mass Desecration
 2004: Ritual Doom Rehearsal
 2004: Grave Damnation
 2004: Ritual Crucifixion

Studio albums
 2007: Triune Impurity Rites
 2011: Doom of the Occult
 2018: Domedon Doxomedon

Live albums
 2014: Darkness Comes To...Live!

EPs and singles 
 2004: Curse of the Necromantical Sabbath
 2004: Baptized by the Black Urine of the Deceased
 2005: Split EP with Loss
 2006: Split EP with Teitanblood
 2014: Nine Graves

References

External links 
 

German death metal musical groups
German doom metal musical groups
Musical groups established in 2001
Musical groups from Berlin
Musical groups disestablished in 2021